Constitution Square may refer to:
 Constitution Square Historic Site
 Constitution Square (Kyiv)
 Constitution Square (Montevideo)
 Constitution Square (Ottawa)
 Constitution Square (Warsaw)
 Piața Constituției
 Plaza de la Constitución (Málaga)
 Plaza de la Constitución (Santiago)
 Zócalo, formally Plaza de la Constitución

See also
 Syntagma Square